Dorothy M. Kosinski is an American scholar of nineteenth and twentieth-century art, curator and the director (since 2008) of The Phillips Collection, an art museum in Washington, D. C.

Biography
Kosinski was born in Meriden, Connecticut, into a Catholic family and grew up in Wallingford, Connecticut, and got her BA from Yale University and her MA and PhD degrees from the New York University Institute of Fine Arts. After being an intern and curatorial assistant at the Guggenheim Museum, she became a curator for the Bruce Museum in Greenwich, Connecticut, and, from 1985 to 1997, for the private collection of cubist art left by Douglas Cooper in Basel, Switzerland. From 1995 to 2008, she worked at the Dallas Museum of Art, where she worked in different capacities before she eventually became senior curator of painting and sculpture, then was appointed director at The Phillips Collection, where she succeed Jay Gates. She was also an independent curator for the National Gallery in Prague, the Kunstmuseum Wolfsburg, the Kunstmuseum Basel, and the Royal Academy of Arts. Her experience amounts to over 30 exhibitions.

Kosinski has published on artists including Gustave Courbet, Henri Matisse, and Vincent van Gogh and on various topics in nineteenth and twentieth-century art. Her book "Matisse: Painter as Sculptor" was among "The best books of 2007" listed by the Financial Times. In total, Kosinski can look back on over 35 publications.  As an expert of nineteenth and twentieth-century art Kosinski has been quoted by the New York Times and the Washington Post.

President Obama appointed her in 2012 to the National Council on the Humanities, an advisory council to the National Endowment for the Humanities. In December 2017 Kosinski was awarded the Order of the Star of Italy for her "outstanding contributions to the arts and promotion of Italian culture".

She is a member of the US-China Forum on the Arts and Culture. She is also director of the Morris & Gwendolyn Cafritz Foundation and of the Sherman Fairchild Foundation, as well as a member of the Association of Art Museum Directors.

Kosinski is married to the Swiss-born architect Thomas Krahenbuhl. They have one daughter.

Publications 

 1987: Douglas Cooper Und Die Meister Des Kubismus and the Masters of Cubism, Univ of Washington Pr, 
1990: Picasso, Braque, Gris, Leger: Douglas Cooper Collecting Cubism, Museum of Fine Arts Houston, 
1994: Fernand Leger 1911-1924: The Rhythm of Modern Life (Art & Design),  Prestel Pub, 
1999: The Artist and the Camera, Yale University Press, 
 2001: Henry Moore, Yale University Press, 
 2005: Dialogues, Yale University Press, 
 2006: Van Gogh's Sheaves of Wheat, Yale University Press, 
 2007: Matisse, Yale University Press, 
2012: Per Kirkeby, Yale University Press, 
 2013: Angels, Demons, and Savages, Yale University Press, 
2013: Giorgio de Chirico: Myth and Archaeology, Silvana Editorale, 
2013: Impressionism and Post-Impressionism at the Dallas Museum of Art: The Richard R. Brettell Lecture Series, Dallas Museum of Art, 
2015: Gauguin to Picasso, Masterworks from Switzerland: The Staechelin & Im Obersteg Collections, GILES, 
2017: Markus Lüpertz, Sieveking, 
2020: Riffs and Relations: African American Artists and the European Modernist Tradition, Rizzoli Electa,

References

External links
Kosinski at The Phillips Collection website

American art historians
American art curators
American women curators
Yale University alumni
New York University Institute of Fine Arts alumni
Year of birth missing (living people)
Living people
Women art historians
People from Meriden, Connecticut
People from Wallingford, Connecticut
American women historians
Historians from Connecticut
21st-century American women